Lucas Samalenge (2 October 1928 – 19 November 1961) was a Congolese and Katangese politician who was Katanga's Secretary of State of Information.

Early life and career 
Samalenge was born on 2 October 1928. He became a nationally elected Member of Parliament for the CONAKAT party for the district of Élisabethville. This party consisted mostly of Southern Katangese people, including Moïse Tshombe and Godefroid Munongo. He was the only MP of his party to vote the investiture at the Lumumba Government in June 1960.

During the mutiny of the Force Publique, on 5 July, a Provincial Council in Élisabethville reexamined the appointment of a State Commissioner for the Katanga Province. Jason Sendwe, Tshombe's main political rival, held the position, but the Council opposed his appointment. Sendwe, however, retained his position.

Katangese secession 

When Katangese provincial governor Moïse Tshombe declared the independence of the State of Katanga from the Congo, four delegations were sent out abroad to explain what happened in the region. They were headed by Jean-Baptiste Kibwe, Évariste Kibwe, Henri Ndala Kambola, and Samalenge. Samalenge's delegation further consisted of H. Schumacker and Rémy Kabamba. They were to organise, in Brazzaville, a clandestine office for propaganda destined for the Republic of the Congo, the "Voice of Liberty" (Voix de la liberté), and get in touch with resistance movements such as Jabako (youth wing of Abako), Jepuna (youth wing of Puna), MNC-Kalonji and organise a propaganda campaign.

In October 1960, five Secretariats of State were created in Katanga, thereby enlarging the government. Samalenge became the Secretary of State of Information. His Chef de cabinet was the Belgian journalist Etienne Ugeux and deputy Chef de cabinet was Barthélemy Bwengu. Public relations officer for Samalenge's office was Christian Souris, who later wrote a novel based on true facts under the pseudonym Christian Lanciney, named Les héros sont affreux. Ugeux's son Dominique Ugeux claimed that Tshombe alerted Etienne Ugeux that Samalenge had no experience in the field of information and was only picked for political and ethnic reasons.

According to political scientist Catherine Hoskyns, his office had a dual function of offering a Katangese nationalism for the Katangese people, and to brand the country as a peaceful, prosperous, Western-oriented state endangered by black nationalism and pro-communist forces in the Congo and at the United Nations. The information secretariat coordinated the Katangese representations in Brussels (headed by Jacques Masangu), Paris (headed by Dominique Diur), and the Katanga Information Services in New York (headed by Michel Struelens), as well as the various pro-Katangese groups abroad. In March 1961, Tshombe sent out Samalenge to Paris for several months in order to negotiate with ORTF the creation of a television station in Katanga, which did not exist at the time. According to Etienne Ugeux's son, this was done by Tshombe to remove Samalenge from his office for a few months because of his "incompetence". He characterised Samalenge as an "inveterate show-off" who "liked the good life".

The propaganda efforts abroad in Katanga and abroad were successful. After Operation Rum Punch in August 1961, it seemed as if the secession was on its last legs, but the failure of Operation Morthor and the death of UN Secretary-General Dag Hammarskjöld further consolidated the regime. Samalenge issued a statement in October 1961 in which he boasted that the 1.7 million Katangans have defeated the whole United Nations of more than 2 billion people, which succeeded because Katanga was in the right, according to him.

Assassination of Lumumba 
At the time of the arrival of prisoners Patrice Lumumba, Maurice Mpolo, and Joseph Okito in a Douglas DC-4 plane at the airport of Luano in Katanga's capital Élisabethville during the afternoon of 17 January 1961, Samalenge was at the Cinéma Palace movie theatre with his Chef de cabinet Etienne Ugeux and Tshombe at a screening of the Moral Re-Armament campaign when Tshombe was called to his residence somewhere between 16:00 and 17:00. Minister of Finance Jean-Baptiste Kibwe later denied that Samalenge was present when the three Congolese politicians were assassinated near Élisabethville, but other sources place him at the execution. 

Samalenge was one of the very first individuals, or perhaps the first individual, to reveal Lumumba's death. According to Carlo Huyghé, he went on a pub crawl on the streets of the capital on 18 January and drunkenly confided to journalist Léopold Daffe of the Secretariat of Information the details of the assassination. According to Ludo De Witte, Samalenge went to the busy bar Le Relais and told everyone that Lumumba was murdered and he kicked his corpse. He then went around repeating the story until the police took him away.

Death 
Lucas Samalenge died on 19 November 1961 under suspicious circumstances. Jules Chomé, Belgian lawyer and critic of the Katangese secession (and, later, a notable critic of Mobutu Sese Seko) reported that he officially died during a hunting incident, but that he was probably assassinated because he knew too much about the death of Lumumba. According to the official version, Frédéric Vandewalle wrote, Samalenge was the victim of a hunting accident caused by a member of his cabinet, but the public rumour suggested an assassination. The alleged incident took place in the woods 120 km northwest of Élisabethville.
His death occurred during the same week of Katangese Minister of National Education Joseph Kiwele's death of a brain thrombosis on 14 November. His body showed gunshot wounds in his neck, and when he was found, the people accompanying Samalenge already disappeared. They were never identified.

Legacy 
In 1961, a literary competition named "Lucas Samalenge" was organised in Élisabethville.

See also
List of unsolved deaths

References

Notes 

1928 births
1961 deaths
Accidental deaths in the Democratic Republic of the Congo
CONAKAT politicians
Deaths by firearm in the Democratic Republic of the Congo
Democratic Republic of the Congo anti-communists
Firearm accident victims
Government ministers of the State of Katanga
Hunting accident deaths
People of the Congo Crisis
People of the State of Katanga
Unsolved deaths